The Ryazansky suburban railway line is one of eleven railway lines used for suburban railway connections between Moscow, Russia, and surrounding areas, mostly in Moscow Oblast. The Ryazansky suburban railway line connects Moscow with the stations in the south-east, in particular, with the towns of Lyubertsy, Kurovskoye, and Shatura. The stations the line serves are located in Moscow, in Lyubertsy, Ramenskoye, Voskresensk, Kolomna, and Lukhovitsy in Moscow Oblast, as well as Rybnovsky and Ryazansky Districts and the city of Ryazan in Ryazan Oblast. The suburban trains have their northwestern terminus at Moscow Kazansky railway station in Moscow. In the southeastern direction, the suburban trains terminate at Ippodrom, Faustovo, Vinogradovo, 88km, Shifernaya, Golutvin, Ryazan I, and Ryazan II. The line is operated by Moscow Railway. The tracks between Moscow Kazansky railway station and Lyubertsy I are also used by Kazansky suburban railway line.

The suburban railway line follows the railway which connects Moscow with Ryazan and continues further to Samara and Saratov. It is electrified and has at least two tracks everywhere between Moscow and Ryazan.

History
The railway between Moscow and Kolomna was constructed between 1860 and 1862 and was officially open for passenger and cargo traffic on 20 July 1862. 

The section between Moscow and Lyubertsy has been electrified in 1933. In 1934, the electrification was extended to Bykovo, and in 1935 to Ramenskoye. It was extended to Ryazan in 1958.

Stations
Following the standard notations in Russia, a railway stop below is called a station if it is a terminus or if it has a cargo terminal, and it is called a platform otherwise.
 Moscow Kazansky railway station (station), transfer to Kurskaya metro station of Sokolnicheskaya line and Komsomolskaya metro station of Koltsevaya line;
 Elektrozavodskaya (platform), transfer to Elektrozavodskaya metro station;
 Sortirovochnaya (platform);
 Aviamotornaya (platform), transfer to Aviamotornaya metro station of Kalininsko–Solntsevskaya and Aviamotornaya metro station of Bolshaya Koltsevaya line;
 Andronovka (platform), transfer to Andronovka Moscow Central Circle station;
 Perovo (station);
 Plyushchevo (platform);
 Veshnyaki (platform);
 Vykhino (platform), transfer to Vykhino metro station;
 Kosino (platform), transfer to Lermontovsky Prospekt and Kosino metro stations;
 Ukhtomskaya (platform);
 Lyubertsy I (station), the last station jointly used with Kazansky suburban railway line;
 Panki (platform);
 Tomilino (platform);
 Kraskovo (platform);
 Malakhovka (platform);
 Udelnaya (platform);
 Bykovo (station);
 Ilyinskaya (platform);
 Otdykh (platform);
 Kratovo (platform);
 Yeseninskaya (platform);
 Fabrichnaya (platform);
 Ramenskoye (station);
 Ippodrom (platform);
 Sovkhoz (platform);
 Zagornovo (platform);
 Bronnitsy (station);
 Raduga (platform);
 63 km (platform);
 Beloozyorsky (platform);
 Faustovo (station);
 Zolotovo (platform);
 Vinogradovo (station);
 Konobeyevo (platform);
 Trofimovo (platform);
 88 km (platform);
 Voskresensk (station), transfer to Greater Ring of the Moscow Railway;
 Shifernaya (station);
 Moskvoretskaya (platform);
 Tsemgigant (platform);
 Peski (station);
 Konev Bor (platform);
 Khoroshyovo (platform);
 113 km (platform);
 Kolomna (platform);
 Golutvin (station), connection to Ozyory;
 Shchurovo (station);
 Chyornaya (platform);
 Lukhovitsy (station);
 142 km (platform);
 Podlipki (station);
 Fruktovaya (station);
 Alpatyevo (station);
 Slyomy (platform);
 Divovo (station);
 Rybnoye (station), connection to Uzunovo;
 Ryazan-Sortirovochnaya (platform);
 187 km (platform);
 189 km (platform);
 Nedostoyevo (platform);
 Dyagilevo (station);
 Lagerny (platform), the last station before branching to Ryazan I and Ryazan II;
 Ryazan I (station), connection to Kustaryovka;
 Ryazan II (station), connection to Ryazhsk I.

References

Rail transport in Moscow
Rail transport in Moscow Oblast
Rail transport in Ryazan Oblast
Moscow Railway